The 2012 United States presidential election in Kentucky took place on November 6, 2012, as part of the 2012 General Election in which all 50 states plus the District of Columbia participated. Kentucky voters chose eight electors to represent them in the Electoral College via a popular vote pitting incumbent Democratic President Barack Obama and his running mate, Vice President Joe Biden, against Republican challenger and former Massachusetts Governor Mitt Romney and his running mate, Congressman Paul Ryan.

Romney carried Kentucky by a landslide margin, winning 60.49% of the vote to Obama's 37.80%. This represented a margin of 22.69%, a great improvement for the Republican Party from 2008, when they won with a 16.23% margin. Although Kentucky had been won by Southern Democrat Bill Clinton twice in the 1990s, Obama was seen as a poor cultural fit for the state, and he did not compete here either time he ran. The Romney campaign also attacked Obama's administration as being hostile to the coal industry, historically an important part of the state's economy. Consequently, Obama suffered a historically poor showing in the traditionally staunchly Democratic coalfields of Eastern Kentucky, where many counties that had even voted by wide margins for landslide Democratic losers like George McGovern and Walter Mondale defected to the Republicans in 2012. Knott County, which had given Clinton 73% of the vote in 1996 and nearly 72% to Mondale in 1984 (despite the latter losing nationally by more than 18 percentage points and only carrying one state), gave Romney 73% of the vote in 2012.   Even Elliott County, the only county in the state in which Obama had broken 60% in 2008, barely held on in 2012, giving Obama a narrow plurality win, his only victory in the region, and one of just four county wins in the entire state. Wolfe County, which had returned to the Democratic Party in 2004 and 2008 after casting its first-ever Republican vote for George W. Bush in 2000, went for Romney by over twenty points. As such, Obama became the first Democrat to ever win the White House without carrying Wolfe County since its founding in 1860, Menifee County since its founding in 1869, or Henderson County since the founding of the Republican Party.

The only part of the state where Obama won convincingly was Jefferson County, the most urban and populous county in the state, and home to Louisville. He also eked out a close win in Fayette County, the second-most populous county, home to Lexington. Despite losing five counties he won in 2008, he managed to flip Franklin County, home to the state capital of Frankfort, which he had narrowly lost in 2008. This is the last time Elliott and Franklin Counties voted for a Democrat. Obama is the only Democrat to ever win two terms without carrying the state at least once.

Primaries

Democratic

Barack Obama's only "opponent" in the primary was the "Uncommited" ballot option, which garnered more than 42% of the primary vote, making Kentucky one of Obama's worst contested primary results.

Republican

The Republican primary occurred on May 22, 2012. 42 delegates were chosen, all of which were allocated to and pledged to vote for Mitt Romney at the 2012 Republican National Convention. Three delegates remain unpledged to any candidate. All Republicans in Kentucky were allowed to participate in the primary. A Republican primary was also held in Arkansas on this day.

Rick Santorum and Newt Gingrich withdrew from the presidential race on April 10 and May 2, 2012, respectively. Both endorsed Mitt Romney as the Republican nominee.

General election

Results

By county

Counties that flipped from Democratic to Republican 

 Hancock (largest city: Lewisport)
 Henderson (largest city: Henderson)
 Menifee (largest city: Frenchburg)
 Rowan (largest city: Morehead)
 Wolfe (largest city: Campton)

Counties that flipped from Republican to Democratic 
 Franklin (largest city: Frankfort)

By congressional district
Romney won 5 of 6 congressional districts.

Analysis
On election night, Kentucky went as expected to the Republican candidate Massachusetts Governor Mitt Romney over Incumbent Democratic President Barack Obama of bordering Illinois. Obama was reelected but nonetheless, lost Kentucky. In most recent years Democrats have maintained their lead in registered voters compared to Republicans. However, Kentucky is known as a highly conservative state with a populist streak. In most recent presidential elections in Kentucky, Democrats usually achieve lower 40 or upper 30% margins. Obama performed significantly worse in 2012 than he did in 2008. Appalachian Kentucky used to be a place were Democrats thrived because of working-class people, particularly unionized coal miners. However this region has become more and more Republican in recent years. Romney performed, for the most part, very well statewide. Obama won four counties. Obama was however able to maintain a solid performance in perhaps the most Democratic place in the state, Jefferson County (Louisville Metro). The other counties Obama won were Franklin, Elliott and Fayette.

See also
Republican Party presidential debates, 2012
Republican Party presidential primaries, 2012
Results of the 2012 Republican Party presidential primaries
Kentucky Republican Party

References

External links
The Green Papers: for Kentucky
The Green Papers: major state elections in chronological order

United States President
Kentucky
2012